Shamlan may refer to:
 Shamlan, Iran
 Shamlan, Yemen